Mercantile Exchange of Vietnam (MXV) is the only national centralized commodity trading market organizer in Vietnam, licensed by the Vietnam Ministry of Industry & Trade.

MXV is located in Hanoi, Vietnam, and was launched in December 2006. It has connected most of the major futures and forwards exchanges in the world such as: London Metal Exchange (LME); CME Group (CBOT, CME, COMEX, NYMEX); Intercontinental Exchange; Osaka Commodity Exchange (OSE); Singapore Commodity Exchange (SGX) and Bursa Malaysia Derivatives Exchange.

At MXV, there are 31 commodities with 38 types of futures contracts, which are standard, mini and micro futures contracts.

February 2006, the trading value at MXV exceeded VND10 trillion (US$438 million) for the first time, a milestone in the development of the commodity trading market in Vietnam.

See also 

 Hanoi Stock Exchange
 Ho Chi Minh City Stock Exchange

References

External links 
 Official website

Financial services companies established in 2006
2006 establishments in Vietnam
Economy of Vietnam
Economy of Hanoi